Events in the year 1646 in Norway.

Incumbents
Monarch: Christian IV

Events

The mining community Røros Bergstad is founded.

Arts and literature

Births

Deaths

See also

References